François-Xavier Fumu Tamuzo (born 3 April 1995) is a French professional footballer who plays as a striker for  club Laval. He is a former France youth international.

Club career
Fumu Tamuzo is a youth exponent from AJ Auxerre. He made his Ligue 2 debut on 1 August 2014 against Le Havre AC in a 2–0 home win. He started in the first eleven, before being substituted after 76 minutes to Cheick Fantamady Diarra.

On 4 August 2020, Fumu Tamuzo signed with Marítimo. On 28 July 2021, he returned to France and signed a two-year contract with Laval.

International career
Fumu Tamuzo was born in France to parents of Democratic Republic of the Congo descent. He is a former France youth international.

Honours 
Laval

 Championnat National: 2021–22

References

External links
 
 
 

1995 births
Living people
French sportspeople of Democratic Republic of the Congo descent
Footballers from Paris
Association football forwards
French footballers
France youth international footballers
AJ Auxerre players
US Quevilly-Rouen Métropole players
AS Béziers (2007) players
C.S. Marítimo players
Stade Lavallois players
Primeira Liga players
Ligue 2 players
Championnat National players
Championnat National 2 players
Championnat National 3 players
French expatriate footballers
Expatriate footballers in Portugal
French expatriate sportspeople in Portugal
Black French sportspeople